The 1927 Utah Utes football team represented the University of Utah as a member of the Rocky Mountain Conference (RMC) during the 1927 college football season. Led by third-year head coach Ike Armstrong, the Utes compiled an overall record of 3–3–1 with a mark of 3–1–1 in conference play, tying for third place in the RMC. 1927 was the first year Utah played at Ute Stadium—now known as Robert Rice Stadium. Although the name has changed and there have been several renovations, the Utes have played in the same location since 1927.

Schedule

References

Utah
Utah Utes football seasons
Utah Utes football